Russell Claude Smith (born August 2, 1963 in Johannesburg, South Africa) is a Canadian writer and newspaper columnist. Smith's novels and short stories are mostly set in Toronto, where he lives.

Biography 

Smith grew up in Halifax, Nova Scotia. He attended the Halifax Grammar School and Queen Elizabeth High School, and studied French literature at Queen's University, the University of Poitiers, and the University of Paris III. He has an MA in French from Queen's.

As a freelance reporter and cultural commentator, he has published in the New York Review of Books, Details, The Walrus,Toronto Life, Flare, Now, EnRoute and other journals. He won the William Allen White award for magazine writing in 1995.

From 1999 to 2020, Smith wrote a weekly column on the arts for The Globe and Mail. On resigning from the column, Smith published an article in The Walrus blaming his departure on a lack of editorial support. 

He was the host of the CBC radio program on language, And Sometimes Y, for two seasons.

Smith taught the Fiction Workshop in the University of Guelph's Master of Fine Arts in Creative Writing programme from 2009 to 2017.

In 2019 he became an acquiring editor for Dundurn Press.

Smith was born with complete complex syndactyly, having inherited the deformity from his father and grandfather; Smith's own son, Hugo, was born with the condition.

Fiction 

His early novels, How Insensitive (1994) and Noise (1998), are satirical and comic portrayals of big-city life and the sexual mores of young people. How Insensitive was nominated for the Governor General's Award, at that time the most prestigious Canadian literary prize. Noise was published in German as Glamour by List Verlag. His book of short stories, Young Men, followed in 1999. The opening story in that collection, "Party Going", won the Canadian National Magazine Award for fiction in 1997.

He then published an illustrated fantasy novella, The Princess and the Whiskheads, an allegory about the role of art in a metropolis. The illustrations were by Wesley Bates.

His pornographic novel, Diana: A Diary in the Second Person (2003), was published by Gutter Press under the pseudonym Diane Savage. The novel was republished, under his own name, with a new introduction, by Biblioasis in 2008.

Muriella Pent (2004) is a longer and more ambitious novel, concerning the arrival of a Caribbean writer of mixed race in the stodgy environment of official Canadian culture. It was shortlisted for the Rogers Writers' Trust Fiction Prize, and named as Best Fiction of 2004 by Amazon.ca.

His novel Girl Crazy was published by HarperCollins Canada in 2010.

His short story collection, Confidence, was published in 2015, and was longlisted for the 2015 Scotiabank Giller Prize. One of the stories in that collection, "Raccoons", won the Canadian National Magazine Award for fiction in that year.

Other works 

In 2005 Thomas Dunne Books published Smith's non-fiction book, Men's Style: The Thinking Man's Guide To Dress, which is based on his regular column on men's fashion in the Canadian national newspaper, The Globe and Mail. The book was illustrated by Edwin Fotheringham.

Smith's memoir Blindsided: How Twenty Years of Writing About Booze, Drugs and Sex Ended in the Blink of an Eye is available as an e-book.

In 2018, Smith compiled and edited the anthology Best Canadian Stories 2018 (Biblioasis). 

In 2020, Smith translated Quebec novelist Nadine Bismuth's novel Un Lien Familial, as A Family Affair (Anansi).

Bibliography
 How Insensitive (1994)
 Noise (1998)
 German transl. by Marlies Ruß: Glamour. List, Munich 2000
 Young Men (1999)
 The Princess and the Whiskheads (2002)
 Diana: A Diary in the Second Person (2003)
 Muriella Pent (2004)
 Men's Style: The Thinking Man's Guide to Dress (2005)
 Girl Crazy (2010)
 Confidence (2015)
Best Canadian Stories 2018 (editor) (2018)
A Family Affair by Nadine Bismuth (translator) (2020)

References

External links
 Russell Smith
 An interview with Russell Smith on Notebook on Cities and Culture

1963 births
Living people
University of Paris alumni
South African emigrants to Canada
Canadian male novelists
Canadian columnists
Canadian male short story writers
CBC Radio hosts
Writers from Halifax, Nova Scotia
Writers from Toronto
People from Johannesburg
20th-century Canadian short story writers
21st-century Canadian short story writers
20th-century Canadian male writers
21st-century Canadian male writers
Canadian male non-fiction writers